The 2002 America East Conference baseball tournament was held from May 23 through 25 at Mahaney Diamond in Orono, Maine.  The top four regular season finishers of the league's seven teams qualified for the double-elimination tournament.  In the championship game, first-seeded Maine defeated third-seeded Northeastern, 7-5, to win its second tournament championship (its first under head coach Paul Kostacopoulos).  As a result, Maine received the America East's automatic bid to the 2002 NCAA Tournament.

Seeding
The top four finishers from the regular season were seeded one through four based on conference winning percentage only.  They then played in a double-elimination format.  In the first round, the one and four seeds were matched up in one game, while the two and three seeds were matched up in the other.

Results

All-Tournament Team
The following players were named to the All-Tournament Team.

Most Outstanding Player
Maine second baseman Brett Ouellette was named Most Outstanding Player.

References

America East Conference Baseball Tournament
Tournament
American East Conference baseball tournament
America East Conference baseball tournament
College sports tournaments in Maine
Baseball competitions in Maine
Sports in Orono, Maine